Runder Berg is a mountain of Baden-Württemberg, Germany.
The round mountain in Bad Urach is an oval hill (711 m above sea level) in the Swabian Alb, which is up stands about 250 meters above the valley and through a narrow saddle with the Alb plateau. On about 0.45 hectare plateau several prehistoric and hilltop settlements in particular the castle a small Alemanni king in the 4th and 5th centuries were, (see Alamannic hillfort). After numerous stray finds were made famous by the Round Mountain since 1932, extensive excavations were carried out on the entire mountain and on a terrace on a slope 1967–1984.

Mountains and hills of the Swabian Jura